Tajikistan competed at the 2014 Winter Olympics in Sochi, Russia from 7 to 23 February 2014. The team consisted of one alpine skier, Alisher Qudratov. Qudratov will become nation's second athlete to compete at the Winter Olympics. The team struggled with lack of funding and resources to qualify for the games.

Originally Andrei Drygin the country's only ever Winter Olympian was selected to compete for the country. However he was replaced with Alisher Qudratov because Qudratov became the first athlete born in the country to qualify for the Winter Olympics and was younger.

Tajikistan's president Emomali Rahmon was among the 65 heads of state that were present during the opening ceremony.

Competitors

Alpine skiing 

According to the final quota allocation released on January 20, 2014 Tajikistan had qualified one athlete.

References

External links 
Tajikistan at the 2014 Winter Olympics

Nations at the 2014 Winter Olympics
2014
Winter Olympics